Cape St. Francis is a provincial electoral district for the House of Assembly of Newfoundland and Labrador, Canada.

The vast majority of the district is made up of suburban communities neighbouring the provincial capital St. John's, though the district does take in the northeast end of the city. The majority of residents commute into St. John's daily for work. Prior to 1996, the district was named St. John's East Extern, though that riding did not contain the actual Cape St. Francis prior to 1975. That district was created in 1962 from St. John's East. 

The district's boundaries encompass the northeastern tip of Avalon Peninsula, including the outer stretches of St. John's as well as Bauline, Flatrock, Logy Bay-Middle Cove-Outer Cove, Pouch Cove and Torbay. Torbay is the largest community in the district.

The district has been a Progressive Conservative stronghold for over 60 years.

Members of the House of Assembly
The district has elected the following Members of the House of Assembly:

Election results

References

External links 
Website of the Newfoundland and Labrador House of Assembly
 

Newfoundland and Labrador provincial electoral districts
Politics of St. John's, Newfoundland and Labrador